Allsvenskan 2005, part of the 2005 Swedish football season, was the 81st Allsvenskan season played. The first match was played 9 April 2005 and the last match was played 23 October 2005. Djurgårdens IF won the league ahead of runners-up IFK Göteborg, while Landskrona BoIS, GIF Sundsvall and Assyriska Föreningen were relegated.

Participating clubs

League table

Results

Relegation play-offs 

GAIS won 2–1 on aggregate.

Season statistics

Top scorers

Attendances

References 

Online

External links
Allsvenskan 2005, Svensk Fotboll

Allsvenskan seasons
Swed
Swed
1